Lachenalia quadricolor, the fourcoloured opal flower, is a species of flowering plant in the genus Lachenalia, native to the southwest Cape Provinces of South Africa. It has gained the Royal Horticultural Society's Award of Garden Merit.

References

quadricolor
Garden plants
Endemic flora of South Africa
Plants described in 1797